Lykens Township is one of the sixteen townships of Crawford County, Ohio, United States. As of the 2010 census the population was 660.

Geography
Located in the northwestern part of the county, it borders the following townships:
Bloom Township, Seneca County - north
Chatfield Township - east
Holmes Township - south
Tod Township - southwest corner
Texas Township - west
Eden Township, Seneca County - northwest corner

No municipalities are located in Lykens Township, although the unincorporated communities of Brokensword and Lykens lie on the border with Holmes Township and in the township's center, respectively.

Name and history
Lykens Township was founded in about 1832. It was named after Lykens, Pennsylvania.

It is the only Lykens Township statewide.

Government
The township is governed by a three-member board of trustees, who are elected in November of odd-numbered years to a four-year term beginning on the following January 1. Two are elected in the year after the presidential election and one is elected in the year prior. There is also an elected township fiscal officer, who serves a four-year term beginning on April 1 of the year after the election, which is held in November of the year before the presidential election. Vacancies in the fiscal officership or on the board of trustees are filled by the remaining trustees.

References

External links
County website

Townships in Crawford County, Ohio
Townships in Ohio